Jozef Ninis (born 28 June 1981 in Čadca) is a Slovakian luger who has competed since 1996. Competing in two Winter Olympics, he earned his best finish of 22nd in the men's singles event at Turin in 2006.

Ninis's best finish at the FIL World Luge Championships was 13th in the men's singles event at Oberhof in 2008. Now it is 12th place in the men's singles event in 2020 FIL World Luge Championships

References
 2006 luge men's singles results
 FIL-Luge profile

External links
 

1981 births
Living people
Lugers at the 2006 Winter Olympics
Lugers at the 2010 Winter Olympics
Lugers at the 2014 Winter Olympics
Lugers at the 2018 Winter Olympics
Lugers at the 2022 Winter Olympics
Olympic lugers of Slovakia
People from Čadca
Sportspeople from the Žilina Region
Slovak male lugers